Catocala angusi, Angus' underwing, is a moth of the family Erebidae. It is found from Massachusetts and Connecticut south to Georgia west to Arkansas and Kansas and north to Illinois and Michigan.

The wingspan is 60–74 mm. Adults are on wing from July to October depending on the location.

The larvae feed on Carya illinoinensis and Carya ovata.

References

External links
Species info
Bug Guide

Moths described in 1876
angusi
Moths of North America